First Round Knock Out is a compilation album by rapper and hip hop producer Dr. Dre. The album was released in 1996 on Triple X Records and was mostly produced by Dr. Dre, as well as Cold 187um and Chris "The Glove" Taylor, who produced one song each .  Artists featured on the album include Dr. Dre, Snoop Dogg, The D.O.C., Kokane, Michel'le, Rose Royce, Jimmy Z and the World Class Wreckin' Cru. First Round Knock Out managed to make it to #52 on the Billboard 200 and #18 on the Top R&B/Hip-Hop Albums.

Track listing

Charts

Dr. Dre albums
1996 compilation albums
Albums produced by Dr. Dre
Triple X Records compilation albums
Albums produced by Cold 187um
G-funk compilation albums
West Coast hip hop compilation albums
Compilation albums by American artists